Rubert José Quijada Fasciana (born 10 February 1989 in Maturín) is a Venezuelan footballer. He currently plays for  Caracas, as a left back and centre back.

References

External links 
 
 
 

1989 births
Living people
Association football defenders
Venezuelan footballers
Venezuela international footballers
Zulia F.C. players
Caracas FC players
Monagas S.C. players
Al-Gharafa SC players
Expatriate footballers in Qatar
Venezuelan Primera División players
Qatar Stars League players
People from Monagas